This is a list of diplomatic missions of the United Kingdom of Great Britain and Northern Ireland, excluding honorary consulates. The UK has one of the largest global networks of diplomatic missions. UK diplomatic missions to capitals of other Commonwealth of Nations member countries are known as High Commissions (headed by 'High Commissioners'). For three Commonwealth countries (namely India, Nigeria, and Pakistan), the Foreign and Commonwealth Office (FCO) still uses the term "Deputy High Commission" for Consulates-General (headed by Deputy High Commissioners), although this terminology is being phased out. British citizens may get help from the embassy of any other commonwealth country present, when in a country where there is no British embassy. There are also informal arrangements with some other countries, including New Zealand and Australia, to help British nationals in some countries.

In 2004, the FCO carried out a review of the deployment of its diplomatic missions, and subsequently over a two-year period closed its missions in Nassau (in the Bahamas), Asunción (Paraguay), Dili (East Timor), Maseru (Lesotho), Mbabane (Swaziland), Antananarivo (Madagascar), Nuku'alofa (Tonga), Tarawa (Kiribati), and Port Vila (Vanuatu). Additionally several consulates and trade offices were also closed, including those in Fukuoka (Japan), Vientiane (Laos), Douala (Cameroon), Porto (Portugal), along with Frankfurt, Leipzig, and Stuttgart in Germany, and Phoenix, San Juan, and Dallas in the United States. Other consulates in Australia, Germany, France, Spain, New Zealand, and the US were downgraded and staffed by local personnel only. In 2012, Foreign Secretary William Hague announced the opening of embassies in Liberia and Haiti, the re-opening of embassies in Laos, El Salvador, and Paraguay, and the opening of a Consulate-General in Recife (Brazil). He also said that by 2015, the UK would have opened up to eleven new embassies and eight new Consulates or Trade Offices. In 2013, a UK government office was established in Seattle. In 2014, all services at the former UK Consulate in Orlando were transferred to the nearby UK Consulate-General in Miami. In 2015, the UK Consulate-General in Denver was reclassified as a UK Government Office.
In 2018 the Foreign and Commonwealth Office has announced that new High Commissions will open in Antigua and Barbuda, Bahamas, Grenada, Lesotho, Saint Vincent and the Grenadines, Samoa, Swaziland, Tonga and Vanuatu and a British office in Somaliland like the one in Taipei, Taiwan

Africa
 
 Algiers (Embassy)
 
 Luanda (Embassy)
 
 Gaborone (High Commission)
 
 Bujumbura (Embassy Liaison Office)
 
 Yaoundé (High Commission)
 
 N'Djamena (Embassy)
 
 Kinshasa (Embassy)
 
 Djibouti City (Embassy)
 
 Cairo (Embassy)
 Alexandria (Consulate-General)
 
 Asmara (Embassy)
 
 Mbabane (High Commission)
 
 Addis Ababa (Embassy)
 
 Banjul (High Commission)
 
 Accra (High Commission)
 
 Conakry (Embassy)
 
 Abidjan (Embassy)
 
 Nairobi (High Commission)
 
 Maseru (High Commission)
 
 Monrovia (Embassy)
 
 Tripoli (Embassy)
 
 Antananarivo (Embassy)
 
 Lilongwe (High Commission)
 
 Bamako (Embassy)
 
 Nouakchott (Embassy)
 
 Port Louis (High Commission)
 
 Rabat (Embassy)
 Casablanca (Consulate-General)
 
 Maputo (High Commission)
 
 Windhoek (High Commission)
 
 Niamey (Embassy office)
 
 Abuja (High Commission)
 Lagos (Deputy High Commission)
 Kaduna (High Commission Liaison Office)
 Ibadan (Liaison Office)
 Port Harcourt (High Commission Liaison Office)
 
 Kigali (High Commission)
 
 Dakar (Embassy)
 
 Victoria (High Commission)
 
 Freetown (High Commission)
 
 Mogadishu (Embassy)
 Hargeisa (British Office Hargeisa)
 
 Pretoria (High Commission)
 Cape Town (Consulate-General)
 Johannesburg (Trade & Investment Office)
 
 Juba (Embassy)
 
 Khartoum (Embassy)
 
 Dar es Salaam (High Commission)
 
 Tunis (Embassy)
 
 Kampala (High Commission)
 
 Lusaka (High Commission)
 
 Harare (Embassy)

Americas
 
 St. John's (High Commission)
 
 Buenos Aires (Embassy)

 Nassau (High Commission)
 
 Bridgetown (High Commission)
 
 Belmopan (High Commission)
 
 La Paz (Embassy)
 
 Brasília (Embassy)
 Belo Horizonte (Consulate-General)
 Recife (Consulate-General)
 Rio de Janeiro (Consulate-General)
 São Paulo (Consulate-General)
 
 Ottawa (High Commission)
 Calgary (Consulate-General)
 Montreal (Consulate-General)
 Toronto (Consulate-General)
 Vancouver (Consulate-General)
 
 Santiago (Embassy)
 
 Bogotá (Embassy)
 
 San José (Embassy)
 
 Havana (Embassy)
 
 Santo Domingo (Embassy)
 
 Quito (Embassy)
 
 San Salvador (Embassy)
 
 St. George's (High Commission)
 
 Guatemala City (Embassy)
 
 Georgetown (High Commission)
 
 Port-au-Prince (Embassy)
 
 Kingston (High Commission)
 
 Mexico City (Embassy)
 Cancún (Consulate-General)
 Monterrey (Consulate)
 
 Panama City (Embassy)
 
 Asunción (Embassy)
 
 Lima (Embassy)
 
 Castries (High Commission)
 
 Kingstown (High Commission)
 
 Port of Spain (High Commission)
 
 Washington, D.C. (Embassy)
 Atlanta (Consulate-General)
 Boston (Consulate-General)
 Chicago (Consulate-General)
 Houston (Consulate-General)
 Los Angeles (Consulate-General)
 Miami (Consulate-General)
 New York City (Consulate-General)
 San Francisco (Consulate-General)
 Denver (UK government office)
 Minneapolis (UK government office)
 Raleigh (UK government office)
 San Diego (UK government office)
 Seattle (UK government office)
 
 Montevideo (Embassy)
 
 Caracas (Embassy)

Asia
 
 Yerevan (Embassy)
 
 Baku (Embassy)
 
 Manama (Embassy)
 
 Dhaka (High Commission)
 Sylhet (Consular office)
 
 Bandar Seri Begawan (High Commission)
 
 Phnom Penh (Embassy)
 
 Beijing (Embassy)
 Chongqing (Consulate-General)
 Guangzhou (Consulate-General)
 Hong Kong (Consulate-General)
 Shanghai (Consulate-General)
 Wuhan (Consulate-General)
 
 Tbilisi (Embassy)
 
New Delhi (High Commission)
 Ahmedabad (Deputy High Commission)
 Bangalore (Deputy High Commission)
 Chandigarh (Deputy High Commission)
 Chennai (Deputy High Commission)
 Hyderabad (Deputy High Commission)
 Kolkata (Deputy High Commission)
 Mumbai (Deputy High Commission)
 Panaji (British Nationals Assistance Office) 
 
 Jakarta (Embassy)
 Denpasar (Consulate)
 
 Tehran (Embassy)
 
 Baghdad (Embassy)
 Erbil (Consulate-General)
 
 Tel Aviv (Embassy)
 
 Tokyo (Embassy)
 Osaka (Consulate-General)
 
 Amman (Embassy)
 
 Astana (Embassy)
 Almaty (Embassy Office)
 
 Kuwait City (Embassy)
 
 Bishkek (Embassy)
 
 Vientiane (Embassy)
 
 Beirut (Embassy)
 
 Malé (High Commission)
 
 Kuala Lumpur (High Commission)
 
 Ulaanbaatar (Embassy)
 
 Yangon (Embassy) 
 
 Kathmandu (Embassy)
 
 Pyongyang (Embassy)
 
 Muscat (Embassy)
 
 Islamabad (High Commission)
 Karachi (Deputy High Commission)
 Lahore (Trade Office)
 
 Jerusalem (British Consulate General in Jerusalem)
 
 Manila (Embassy)
 
 Doha (Embassy)
 
 Riyadh (Embassy)
 Jeddah (Consulate-General)
 Al Khobar (Trade Office)
 
 Singapore (High Commission)
 
 Seoul (Embassy)
 
 Colombo (High Commission)
 
 Taipei (British Office Taipei)
 
 Dushanbe (Embassy)
 
 Bangkok (Embassy)
 
 Ankara (Embassy)
 Istanbul (Consulate-General)
 İzmir (Consulate)
 Antalya (Vice-Consulate)
 
 Ashgabat (Embassy)
 
 Abu Dhabi (Embassy)
 Dubai (Embassy)
 
 Tashkent (Embassy)
 
 Hanoi (Embassy)
 Ho Chi Minh City (Consulate-General)

Europe
 
 Tirana (Embassy)
 
 Vienna (Embassy)
 
 Minsk (Embassy)
 
 Brussels (Embassy)
 
 Sarajevo (Embassy)
 Banja Luka (Embassy office)
 
 Sofia (Embassy)
 
Zagreb (Embassy)
Split (Consulate)
 
 Nicosia (High Commission)
 
 Prague (Embassy)
 
 Copenhagen (Embassy)
 
 Tallinn (Embassy)
 
 Helsinki (Embassy)
 
 Paris (Embassy)
 Bordeaux (Consulate)
 Marseille (Consulate)
 Lyon (British Trade & Investment Office)
 
 Berlin (Embassy)
 Düsseldorf (Consulate-General)
 Munich (Consulate-General)
 
 Athens (Embassy)
 Corfu (Vice-Consulate)
 Heraklion (Vice-Consulate)
 Rhodes (Vice-Consulate)
 
 Rome (Embassy)
 
 Budapest (Embassy)
 
 Reykjavík (Embassy)
 
 Dublin (Embassy)
 
 Rome (Embassy)
 Milan (Consulate-General)
 
 Pristina (Embassy)
 
 Riga (Embassy)
 
 Vilnius (Embassy)
 
 Luxembourg City (Embassy)
 
 Valletta (High Commission)
 
 Chișinău (Embassy)
 
 Podgorica (Embassy)
 
 The Hague (Embassy)
 Amsterdam (Consulate-General)
 
 Lefkoşa (High Commission Office)
 
 Skopje (Embassy)
 
 Oslo (Embassy)
 
 Warsaw (Embassy)
 
 Lisbon (Embassy)
 Portimão (Vice-Consulate)
 
 Bucharest (Embassy)
 
 Moscow (Embassy)
 Yekaterinburg (Consulate-General)
 
 Belgrade (Embassy)
 
 Bratislava (Embassy)
 
 Ljubljana (Embassy)
 
 Madrid (Embassy)
 Barcelona (Consulate-General)
 Alicante (Consulate)
 Ibiza (Consulate)
 Las Palmas (Consulate)
 Málaga (Consulate)
 Palma de Mallorca (Consulate)
 Santa Cruz de Tenerife (Consulate)
 
 Stockholm (Embassy)
 
 Bern (Embassy)
 
 Kyiv (Embassy)

Oceania
 
 Canberra (High Commission)
 Melbourne (Consulate-General)
 Sydney (Consulate-General)
 Brisbane (Consulate)
 Perth (Consulate)
 
 Suva (High Commission)
 
 Wellington (High Commission)
 Auckland (Consulate-General)
 
 Port Moresby (High Commission)
 
 Apia (High Commission)
 
 Honiara (High Commission)
 
 Nukuʻalofa (High Commission)
 
 Port Vila (High Commission)

Multilateral organisations
 Brussels (mission to the European Union)
 Brussels (permanent representation to the North Atlantic Treaty Organization)
 Geneva (mission to the Office of the United Nations)
 Geneva (permanent representation to the Conference on Disarmament)
 The Hague (representation to the Organisation for the Prohibition of Chemical Weapons)
 Jakarta (mission to the Association of Southeast Asian Nations)
 Manila (representation to the Asian Development Bank)
 Montreal (representation to the International Civil Aviation Organization)
 Nairobi (Mission to United Nations Human Settlements Programme)
 Nairobi (Mission to United Nations Environment Programme)
 New York City (delegation to the United Nations)
 Paris (delegations to the Organisation for Economic Co-operation and Development)
 Paris (delegations to the UNESCO)
 Rome (representation to the United Nations specialized agencies: FAO, World Food Programme and International Fund for Agricultural Development)
 Strasbourg (delegation to the Council of Europe)
 Tunis (representation to the African Development Bank)
 Vienna (mission to the Office of the United Nations)
 Vienna (delegation to the Organization for Security and Co-operation in Europe)
 Washington, D.C. (representation to the Inter-American Development Bank)
 Washington, D.C. (delegations to the International Monetary Fund and the World Bank Group)

Closed missions

Africa

Americas

Asia

Europe

Oceania

Flags

The United Kingdom is one of two countries, the other being Thailand, that use diplomatic flags abroad. These special flags are flown at the chanceries of their embassies and consulates. For High Commissions, the Union Flag is used. In addition, there is a flag in use for British consular vessels in international or foreign waters.

See also

 Foreign and Commonwealth Office
 Foreign relations of the United Kingdom
 List of heads of missions of the United Kingdom
 List of diplomatic missions in the United Kingdom

Notes

References

External links

 Foreign and Commonwealth Office - Find an Embassy

 
United Kingdom
Diplomatic missions